The Samurai Trilogy is a film trilogy directed by Hiroshi Inagaki and starring Toshiro Mifune as Musashi Miyamoto and Kōji Tsuruta as Kojirō Sasaki. The films are based on Musashi, a novel by Eiji Yoshikawa about the famous duelist and author of The Book of Five Rings.

The three films are:
 Samurai I: Musashi Miyamoto (1954)
 Samurai II: Duel at Ichijoji Temple (1955)
 Samurai III: Duel at Ganryu Island (1956)

Together, they are a trilogy following the character growth of Musashi from brash—yet strong—young soldier to thoughtful and introspective samurai.

The choreography for the films was by Yoshio Sugino of the Tenshin Shōden Katori Shintō-ryū.

Reception and influence
Samurai I won the 1955 Academy Award for Best Foreign Language Film.

In a review almost 60 years after the release of the trilogy, the late academic and film critic Stephen Prince noted "the absence of gore" in the films: "Severed limbs and spurting arteries hadn't yet arrived as a movie convention, and the fights in The Samurai Trilogy are relatively chaste, not showing the carnage that such duels would have actually resulted in".

The trilogy became an influence for future films.

References

External links
 
 
 
 

Japanese film series
Jidaigeki films
Samurai films
Trilogies
1950s Japanese films